Nefundella dentata is a species of snout moth in the genus Nefundella. It is found in Belize.

References

Moths described in 1993
Phycitini